Betty Jo Teeter Dobbs (October 19, 1930 – March 29, 1994) was a historian specializing in Isaac Newton's occult studies. Her works include The Foundations of Newtons Alchemy, or the Hunting of the Green Lyon, Alchemical Death and Resurrection, and The Janus Faces of Genius: The Role of Alchemy in Newton's Thought. She was a professor of history at the University of California, Davis from 1991 to 1994.

In 1997, she was awarded posthumously with the George Sarton Medal of the History of Science Society.

References

External links
Betty Jo Dobbs Papers at Special Collections Dept., University Library, University of California, Davis

1930 births
1994 deaths
American historians of science
American women historians
20th-century American historians
20th-century American women writers
Newton scholars
University of California, Davis faculty